Sanford Springs is an unincorporated community in Cherokee County, Alabama, United States.

History
The community was given the name of one or more members of the Sanford family.

References

Unincorporated communities in Cherokee County, Alabama
Unincorporated communities in Alabama